In political science, a multi-party system is a political system in which multiple political parties across the political spectrum run for national elections, and all have the capacity to gain control of government offices, separately or in coalition. Apart from one-party-dominant and two-party systems, multi-party systems tend to be more common in parliamentary systems than presidential systems and far more common in countries that use proportional representation compared to countries that use first-past-the-post elections. Several parties compete for power and all of them have reasonable chance of forming government.

In multi-party systems that use proportional representation, each party wins a number of legislative seats proportional to the number of votes it receives. 

Under first-past-the-post, the electorate is divided into a number of districts, each of which selects one person to fill one seat by a plurality of the vote. First-past-the-post is not conducive to a proliferation of parties, and naturally gravitates toward a two-party system, in which only two parties have a real chance of electing their candidates to office. This gravitation is known as Duverger's law. 

Proportional representation, on the other hand, does not have this tendency, and allows multiple major parties to arise. Proportional systems either has multi-member districts with more than one representative elected from a given district to the same legislative body or some other type of pooling of the votes, and thus there are a greater number of viable parties. Duverger's law states that the number of viable political parties is one, plus the number of seats in a district.

Argentina, Armenia, Belgium, Brazil, Denmark, Finland, France, Germany, Iceland, India, Indonesia, Ireland, the Netherlands, New Zealand, Norway, the Philippines, Poland, Sweden, Tunisia, Turkey and Ukraine are examples of nations that have used a multi-party system effectively in their democracies. In these countries, usually no single party has a parliamentary majority by itself (hung parliaments). Instead, multiple political parties are compelled to form compromised coalitions for the purpose of developing power blocks, usually majority control of the assembly, and attaining legitimate mandate.

Comparisons with other party systems 
Unlike a one-party system (or a dominant-party system), a multi-party system encourages the general constituency to form multiple distinct, officially recognized groups, generally called political parties. Each party competes for votes from the enfranchised constituents (those allowed to vote). A multi-party system prevents the leadership of a single party from controlling a single legislative chamber without challenge.

A system where only two parties have the possibility of winning an election is called a two-party system. A system where only three parties have a realistic possibility of winning an election or forming a coalition is sometimes called a "third-party system". But, in some cases the system is called a "Stalled Third-Party System," when there are three parties and all three parties win a large number of votes, but only two have a chance of winning an election. Usually, this is because the electoral system penalises the third party, e.g. as in Canadian or UK politics. 

A two-party system requires voters to align themselves in large blocks, sometimes so large that they cannot agree on any overarching principles. Some theories argue that this allows centrists to gain control, though this is disputed. On the other hand, if there are multiple major parties, each with less than a majority of the vote, the parties are strongly motivated to work together to form working governments. This also promotes centrism, as well as promoting coalition-building skills while discouraging polarization.

See also
 Polarized pluralism
 Political organisation
 Ingroups and outgroups

References

Political systems
Political party systems
Elections
Government
Types of democracy